The Ford S-Max (stylized as Ford S-MAX) is a car produced by Ford Europe for the European market. A multi-purpose vehicle (MPV), Ford also describes the S-Max as an SAV (sports activity vehicle). Introduced at the 2006 Geneva Motor Show, the S-Max went on sale alongside the new generation Galaxy in June 2006.

The S-Max is intended to be sporty as a saloon car, and spacious as an MPV. It shows inspiration from the seven-seater large MPV Galaxy, and compact MPV Ford C-Max. The S-Max has received many positive reviews and awards, and was voted European Car of the Year 2007 on 13 November 2006. Ford had plans to sell the S-Max in Japan under the then subsidiary brand Mazda, but they are no longer viable since the latter's split.

The model is set to be discontinued in April 2023 alongside the Ford Galaxy due to switching to electric vehicles. The Ford Fiesta will follow it in June 2023.

Features 
The S-Max was the first vehicle in Ford's lineup to feature their Kinetic Design styling. The Kinetic Design scheme includes angular headlights, twin trapezoidal grilles, and large wheelarches.

It comes with heated front and back windscreens, parking sensors, aux input and dual climate control as standard. One major selling point of the S-Max is its "Fold Flat System".  This design allows the second and third-row seats to fold seamlessly into the floor, leaving extra storage space. Also, the S-Max's second row has 3 individual seats, all with ISO-FIX.

First generation (2006)

Models 

For the English speaking markets there are three derivatives of the S-Max: Edge, Zetec, and the high-end Titanium. Ford has stated that around sixty percent of all S-Max buyers choose Titanium specification. Continental trim levels are Trend, Titanium and the top-of-the-line Titanium S.

In March 2008, a 2.2L 175 PS TDCi common rail diesel was added to Titanium series and delivers acceleration from 0-62 mph in 9.0 seconds. In September 2008, the popular 2.0 140 PS TDCi manual engine was offered with a CO2 of 159 g/km. The S-Max Trend debuted in China in 2010. The Trend is basically a normal S-Max, but without the back row of seats. The idea is to make it more affordable, and to give more storage space to people who might want it.

Powertrain 
All S-Maxes use versions of the Duratorq or Duratec engines. The S-Max uses a five-speed or six-speed manual transmission, and a six-speed automatic option.

 This vehicle has also been converted to use an aftermarket conversion hybrid powertrain: Langford Performance Engineering 'Whisper' powertrain  
New petrol engines for the 2010–2011 models:
 1.6 STCi EcoBoost, 6-speed manual, 160 PS
 2.0 STCi EcoBoost, Powershift, 203 PS

Engines available for the 2012 models:
 1.6T 160 PS EcoBoost (Start/Stop), 6-speed manual
 2.0 203 PS EcoBoost, PowerShift auto
 2.0 240 PS EcoBoost, PowerShift auto
 1.6 TDCi 115 PS (Start/Stop), 6-speed manual
 2.0 TDCi 140 PS, 6-speed manual
 2.0 TDCi 140 PS, PowerShift auto
 2.0 TDCi 163 PS, 6-speed manual
 2.0 TDCi 163 PS, PowerShift auto
 2.2 TDCi 200 PS, 6-speed manual
 2.2 TDCi 200 PS, Automatic

Safety 

The Ford S-Max incorporates no breakthrough safety features, but it has received a 5-star/36-point (Best in Class) rating from the Euro NCAP.

The S-Max's safety features include the Intelligent Protection System (IPS) which combines a body structure optimised for strength and crashworthiness with restraint equipment and driver aids that help avoid an accident and features that lessen the likelihood of injuries in an impact. It has many modern airbags, including a knee airbag and a thorax airbag.

S-Max's also have an advanced neck protection system, three point seat belts, optimised pre-tensioners, load limiters, anti-submarining seat subframes, a collapsible steering system and safety pedals. For handling it has an Anti-Lock Braking System (ABS) along with Electronic Brakeforce Distribution (EBD) and standard Electronic Stability Program (ESP) system.

Media 
The high performance version Ford S-Max was reviewed on Top Gear (Series 8, Episode 7) against the similar spec Vauxhall Zafira and the Mercedes B200. The S-Max was the most affordable, yet was described as having the best interior and exterior, and being the most comfortable. The presenters, James May and Richard Hammond, also considered it to be the most practical. Overall, they praised the car and declared it to be the best value for money out of the three.

Second generation (2015) 

The second generation was first presented at the 2014 Paris Motor Show.

After its sibling, Ford Galaxy, was being presented at the 2015 Geneva Motor Show, Ford decided to put it into production in late 2015.

It comes with the same engines as the Galaxy, Mondeo and Edge, which consist of one diesel (in four states of tune) and two petrols. The 1.5 SCTi Ecoboost has 160 hp, and the 2.0 SCTi has 240 hp; the latter can only be had with the Ford 6F automatic transmission. All the diesels average over 50mpg – the best is the 2.0 TDCi Duratorq 120, which produces 57mpg.

Both the 2.0 TDCi 150 and 180 versions come with either a six-speed manual or the Powershift; the latter can also be specced with AWD. The final model, the Bi-Turbo 2.0 TDCi 210 comes with the Powershift Gearbox only, and hits 0 to 62 in under nine seconds. The trim levels are similar to any Ford, and mirror those found in the Galaxy, Mondeo and Edge, including Zetec, Titanium and Titanium Sport; also an executive spec Vignale is available.

Engine specifications

References

External links 

 

S-Max
Euro NCAP large MPVs
Minivans
Front-wheel-drive vehicles
Cars introduced in 2006
2010s cars
Ford CD4 platform